The Super 4's T20 replaced the Sri Lanka Premier League from 2014. The tournament in 2014 was played between 27 June 2014 and 2 July 2014 between four franchise teams all owned by the board.

Teams
Western Troopers
Udarata Rulers
Yaal Blazers
Southern Express

Venues

References

External links
 Sri Lanka Super 4's T20 on Cricketwa

Inter-Provincial Twenty20
Inter-Provincial Twenty20
Super 4's T20
Super 4's T20
Super 4's T20